Crophius is a genus of true bugs in the family Oxycarenidae. There are about 16 described species in Crophius.

Species
These 16 species belong to the genus Crophius:

 Crophius albidus Barber, 1938
 Crophius angustatus Van Duzee, 1910
 Crophius bermani Vinokurov, 1975
 Crophius bohemani (Stal, 1859)
 Crophius coleopteroides Kormilev, 1950
 Crophius convexus Barber, 1938
 Crophius disconotus (Say, 1831)
 Crophius fasciatus (Fieber, 1837)
 Crophius impressus Van Duzee, 1910
 Crophius leucocnemis (Berg, 1879)
 Crophius meridana (Brailovsky, 2014)
 Crophius patagonica (Dellapé & Cheli, 2007)
 Crophius scabrosus (Uhler, 1904)
 Crophius schwarzi Van Duzee, 1910
 Crophius sitesi (Brailovsky, 2014)
 Crophius tumidus Scudder, 2016

References

Lygaeoidea
Articles created by Qbugbot
Pentatomomorpha genera